Siddhapokhari  is market center in Chainpur Municipality of Sankhuwasabha District in the Kosi Zone of north-eastern Nepal. At the time of the 1991 Nepal census it had a population of 3464 people living in 612 individual households.

References

External links
UN map of the municipalities of Sankhuwasabha District

Populated places in Sankhuwasabha District